The United States Open Championship, commonly known as the U.S. Open, is the annual open national championship of golf in the United States. It is the third of the four major championships in golf, and is on the official schedule of both the PGA Tour and the European Tour. Since 1898 the competition has been 72 holes of stroke play (4 rounds on an 18-hole course), with the winner being the player with the lowest total number of strokes. It is staged by the United States Golf Association (USGA) in mid-June, scheduled so that, if there are no weather delays, the final round is played on the third Sunday. The U.S. Open is staged at a variety of courses, set up in such a way that scoring is very difficult, with a premium placed on accurate driving. As of 2022, the U.S. Open awards a $17.5 million purse, the largest of all four major championships.

History

The first U.S. Open was played on October 4, 1895, on a nine-hole course at the Newport Country Club in Newport, Rhode Island. It was a 36-hole competition and was played in a single day. Ten professionals and one amateur entered. The winner was Horace Rawlins, a 21-year-old Englishman, who had arrived in the U.S. earlier that year to take up a position at the host club. He received $150 cash out of a prize fund of $335, plus a $50 gold medal; his club received the Open Championship Cup trophy, which was presented by the USGA.

In the beginning, the tournament was dominated by experienced British players until 1911, when John J. McDermott became the first native-born American winner. American golfers soon began to win regularly and the tournament evolved to become one of the four majors.

Since 1911, the title has been won mostly by players from the United States. Since 1950, players from only six countries other than the United States have won the championship, most notably South Africa, which has won five times since 1965. A streak of four consecutive non-American winners occurred from 2004 to 2007 for the first time since 1910. These four players, South African Retief Goosen (2004), New Zealander Michael Campbell (2005), Australian Geoff Ogilvy (2006) and Argentine Ángel Cabrera (2007), are all from countries in the Southern Hemisphere. Northern Ireland's Graeme McDowell (2010) became the first European player to win the event since Tony Jacklin of England in 1970; three more Europeans won in the next four editions, making it only three American wins in the 11 tournaments from 2004 to 2014.

U.S. Open play is characterized by tight scoring at or around par by the leaders, with the winner usually emerging at around even par. A U.S. Open course is seldom beaten severely, and there have been many over-par wins (in part because par is usually set at 70, except for the very longest courses). Normally, an Open course is quite long and will have a high cut of primary rough (termed "Open rough" by the American press and fans); undulating greens (such as at Pinehurst No. 2 in 2005, which was described by Johnny Miller of NBC as "like trying to hit a ball on top of a VW Beetle"); pinched fairways (especially on what are expected to be less difficult holes); and two or three holes that are short par fives under regular play would be used as long par fours during the tournament (often to meet that frequently used par of 70, forcing players to have accurate long drives). Some courses that are attempting to get into the rotation for the U.S. Open will undergo renovations to develop these features. Rees Jones is the most notable of the "Open Doctors" who take on these projects; his father Robert Trent Jones had filled that role earlier. As with any professional golf tournament, the available space surrounding the course (for spectators, among other considerations) and local infrastructure also factor into deciding which courses will host the event.

Qualification
The U.S. Open is open to any professional, or to any amateur with a USGA Handicap Index not exceeding 1.4. Players (male or female) may obtain a place by being fully exempt or by competing successfully in qualifying. The field is 156 players.

About half of the field is made up of players who are fully exempt from qualifying. The current exemption categories are:
 Winners of the U.S. Open for the last ten years
 Winner and runner-up from the previous year's U.S. Amateur and winners of the previous year's U.S. Junior Amateur and U.S. Mid-Amateur
 The runner-up from the U.S. Amateur, the winner of the U.S. Junior Amateur, and U.S. Mid-Amateur must remain an amateur.  
 The winner of the U.S. Amateur, however, may turn professional after winning the U.S. Amateur and retain his eligibility.
 Winner of the previous year's Amateur Championship
 The previous year's Mark H. McCormack Medal winner for the top-ranked amateur golfer in the world
 Winners of each of Masters Tournament, Open Championship and PGA Championship for the last five years
 Winners of the last three Players Championships
 Winner of the current year's BMW PGA Championship
 Winner of the last U.S. Senior Open
 Players who win multiple U.S. PGA Tour events during the time between tournaments, provided the tournaments each offer 500 or more points to the winner, and are not opposite-field events.
 In the year after the Olympic golf tournament, the reigning men's gold medalist
 Top 10 finishers and ties from the previous year's U.S. Open
 Players who qualified for the previous year's Tour Championship
 The top 60 in the Official World Golf Ranking (OWGR) as of two weeks before the start of the tournament
 The top 60 in the OWGR as of the tournament date
 The top player in the PGA Tour second-tier developmental series points, based on combined points from the Regular Season and Finals, from the previous season (starting in 2023).  
 Special exemptions selected by the USGA
 All remaining spots after the second top 60 OWGR cutoff date filled by alternates from qualifying tournaments.

The exemptions for amateurs apply only if the players remain amateurs as of the tournament date, except for the U.S. Amateur champion. On August 5, 2019, the USGA announced a rule change stating a player may turn professional and still retain his U.S. Open exemption. Note that this tournament typically takes place after the collegiate season has ended, so players may turn professional immediately after their last collegiate event (typically the end of the NCAA final of their senior year) in order to maximize the number of FedEx Cup points they may score before the August cutoff to avoid qualifying school.

Before 2011, the sole OWGR cutoff for entry was the top 50 as of two weeks before the tournament. An exemption category for the top 50 as of the tournament date was added for 2011, apparently in response to the phenomenon of golfers entering the top 50 between the original cutoff date and the tournament (such as Justin Rose and Rickie Fowler in 2010).

Through 2011, exemptions existed for leading money winners on the PGA, European, Japanese, and Australasian tours, as well as winners of multiple PGA Tour events in the year before the U.S. Open. These categories were eliminated in favor of inviting the top 60 on the OWGR at both relevant dates. Starting with the 2012 championship, an exemption was added for the winner of the current year's BMW PGA Championship, the European Tour's equivalent of The Players Championship.

Potential competitors who are not fully exempt must enter the Qualifying process, which has two stages. Firstly there is Local Qualifying, which is played over 18 holes at more than 100 courses around the United States. Many leading players are exempt from this first stage, and they join the successful local qualifiers at the Sectional Qualifying stage, which is played over 36 holes in one day at several sites in the U.S., as well as one each in Europe and Japan. There is no lower age limit and the youngest-ever qualifier was 14-year-old Andy Zhang of China, who qualified in 2012 after Paul Casey withdrew days before the tournament.

USGA special exemptions
The USGA has granted a special exemption to 34 players 52 times since 1966. Players with multiple special exemptions include: Arnold Palmer (1978, 1980, 1981, 1983, 1994), Seve Ballesteros (1978, 1994), Gary Player (1981, 1983), Lee Trevino (1983, 1984), Hale Irwin (1990, 2002, 2003), Jack Nicklaus (1991, 1993, 1995, 1996, 1997, 1998, 1999, 2000), Tom Watson (1993, 1996, 2000, 2003, 2010).

Irwin won the 1990 U.S. Open after accepting a special exemption. In 2016, a special exemption was extended to former champion Retief Goosen (2001, 2004). In 2018, a special exemption was extended to former U.S. Open champions Jim Furyk (2003) and Ernie Els (1994, 1997).

Prizes
The purse at the 2017 U.S. Open was $12 million, and the winner's share was $2.16 million. The European Tour uses conversion rates at the time of the tournament to calculate the official prize money used in their Race to Dubai (€10,745,927 in 2017).

In line with the other majors, winning the U.S. Open gives a golfer several privileges that make his career much more secure if he is not already one of the elite players of the sport. U.S. Open champions are automatically invited to play in the other three majors (the Masters, The Open Championship (British Open), and the PGA Championship) for the next five years. They are also automatically invited to play in The Players Championship for the next five years, and they are exempt from qualifying for the U.S. Open itself for 10 years.

Winners may also receive a five-year exemption on the PGA Tour, which is automatic for regular members. Non-PGA Tour members who win the U.S. Open have the choice of joining the PGA Tour either within 60 days of winning, or prior to the beginning of any one of the next five tour seasons.

Finally, U.S. Open winners receive automatic invitations to three of the five senior majors once they turn 50; they receive a five-year invitation to the U.S. Senior Open and a lifetime invitation to the Senior PGA Championship and Senior British Open.

The top 10 finishers at the U.S. Open are fully exempt from qualifying for the following year's Open, and the top four are automatically invited to the following season's Masters.

Playoff format
Up to 2017, the U.S. Open retained a full 18-hole playoff the following day (Monday). If a tie existed after that fifth round, then the playoff continued as sudden-death on the 91st hole. The U.S. Open advanced to sudden-death three times (1990, 1994, 2008), most recently when Tiger Woods defeated Rocco Mediate on the first additional playoff hole in 2008. Before sudden-death was introduced in the 1950s, additional 18-hole rounds were played (1925, 1939, and 1946) to break the tie. When the playoff was scheduled for 36 holes and ended in a tie, as in 1931, a second 36-hole playoff was required.

Since 2018, the USGA adopted a two-hole aggregate playoff format, after consulting fans, players and media partners. Sudden death will still be played if the playoff ends tied.

Winners

Summary by course, state and region
The U.S. Open has been played on 52 different golf courses; 22 in the Northeast, 18 in the Midwest, 6 in the South, and 6 in the West. 

The eighteenth state to host the tournament was Washington in 2015, followed by Wisconsin in 2017.

Records
 Youngest champion: John McDermott in 1911 at 19 years, 315 days.
 Oldest player to make the cut: Sam Snead in 1973 at 61 years old. He tied for 29th place.
 Most victories: 4 by Willie Anderson 1901, 1903–1905; Bobby Jones 1923, 1926, 1929–30; Ben Hogan 1948, 1950–51, 1953; Jack Nicklaus 1962, 1967, 1972, 1980. NOTE: Hogan also won the 1942 Hale America National Open which was held jointly by the USGA, PGA and Chicago GA for the benefit of the Navy Relief Society and the USO.
 Most consecutive victories: 3 by Willie Anderson 1903–1905.
 Most consecutive victorious attempts: 3 by Ben Hogan 1948, 1950–51
 Most consecutive attempts in top 2: 5 by Bobby Jones 1922–1926
 Most consecutive attempts in top 5: 6 by Willie Anderson 1901–1906
 Most consecutive attempts in top 10: 16 by Ben Hogan 1940–1960 (next highest streak 7)
 Most runner-up finishes: Phil Mickelson – 6 (1999, 2002, 2004, 2006, 2009, 2013)
 Most consecutive Opens started: 44 by Jack Nicklaus from 1957 to 2000.
 Largest margin of victory: 15 strokes by Tiger Woods, 2000. This is the all-time record for all majors.
 Lowest score for 36 holes: 130 – Martin Kaymer (65–65), rounds 1–2, 2014.
 Lowest score for 54 holes: 199 – Rory McIlroy (65–66–68), rounds 1–3, 2011; Louis Oosthuizen (66-66-67), rounds 2–4, 2015.
 Lowest score for 72 holes: 268 – Rory McIlroy (65–66–68–69), rounds 1–4, 2011.
 Most strokes under par for 72 holes: 16-under (268) by Rory McIlroy, 2011; 16-under (272) by Brooks Koepka, 2017.
 Most strokes under par at any point in the tournament: 17 by Rory McIlroy, final round, 2011.
 Lowest score for 18 holes: 63 – Johnny Miller, 4th round, 1973; Jack Nicklaus, 1st, 1980; Tom Weiskopf, 1st, 1980; Vijay Singh, 2nd, 2003; Justin Thomas, 3rd, 2017; Tommy Fleetwood, 4th, 2018.
 Lowest score for 18 holes in relation to par: −9 Justin Thomas, 3rd round, 2017.
 All four rounds under par (golfers who did not win the tournament in italics):
 Lee Trevino, 1968 (69–68–69–69, par 70)
 Tony Jacklin, 1970 (71–70–70–70, par 72)
 Lee Janzen, 1993 (67–67–69–69, par 70)
 Curtis Strange, 1994 (70–70–70–70, par 71)
 Rory McIlroy (65–66–68–69, par 71) and Robert Garrigus (70–70–68–70), 2011
 Brooks Koepka (67–70–68–67, par 72), Charley Hoffman (70–70–68–71), and Brandt Snedeker (70–69–70–71), 2017
 All four rounds under 70: Trevino, 1968; Janzen, 1993; McIlroy, 2011.
 Most frequent venues:
 9 Opens: Oakmont Country Club – 1927, 1935, 1953, 1962, 1973, 1983, 1994, 2007, 2016
 7 Opens: Baltusrol Golf Club – 1903, 1915, 1936, 1954, 1967, 1980, 1993
 6 Opens: 
 Oakland Hills Country Club – 1924, 1937, 1951, 1961, 1985, 1996
 Pebble Beach Golf Links – 1972, 1982, 1992, 2000, 2010, 2019
 Winged Foot Golf Club – 1929, 1959, 1974, 1984, 2006, 2020
 5 Opens: 
 Olympic Club – 1955, 1966, 1987, 1998, 2012
 Merion Golf Club – 1934, 1950, 1971, 1981, 2013
 Shinnecock Hills Golf Club – 1896, 1986, 1995, 2004, 2018
 4 Opens: 
 Myopia Hunt Club – 1898, 1901, 1905, 1908
 Inverness Club – 1920, 1931, 1957, 1979
 The Country Club – 1913, 1963, 1988, 2022 

There is an extensive records section on the official U.S. Open website.

Broadcasting

Beginning with the 2020 tournament, NBCUniversal holds domestic television rights (with coverage on NBC and Golf Channel), having taken over the remainder of the 12-year deal with the USGA signed by Fox Sports in 2013 that gave it exclusive rights to USGA championships from 2015 through 2026. With the postponed 2020 U.S. Open Championship presenting a significant scheduling challenge due to its other fall sports commitments, Fox had held discussions with the USGA over broadcasting the tournament on their cable network FS1 or partnering with NBC. Ultimately, the issues led the network to transfer the final seven years of its contract entirely.

Coverage was previously televised by NBC and ESPN through 2014. NBC's first period as rightsholder began in 1995; ABC held the broadcast rights from 1966 through 1994.

In Australia, from 2015 Fox Sports Australia is the exclusive broadcaster of the U.S. open until 2018.

Future sites

Sources:

See also

 Golf in the United States

Notes

References

External links

United States Golf Association (USGA) official website
USGA photo store

 
Men's major golf championships
Recurring sporting events established in 1895
Annual sporting events in the United States
1895 establishments in Rhode Island